On the review aggregator website Rotten Tomatoes, a film has a rating of 100% if each professional review recorded by the website is assessed as positive rather than negative. The percentage is based on the film's reviews aggregated by the website and assessed as positive or negative, and when all aggregated reviews are positive, the film has a 100% rating. Listed below are films with 100% ratings that have a critics' consensus or have been reviewed by at least twenty film critics. Many of these films, particularly those with a high number of positive reviews, have achieved wide critical acclaim and are often considered among the best films ever made. A number of these films also appear on the AFI's 100 Years...100 Movies lists, but there are many others and several entries with dozens of positive reviews, which are considered surprising to some experts. To date, Leave No Trace holds the site's record, with a rating of 100% and 251 positive reviews.

The 100% rating is vulnerable to a film critic gaming the system by purposely submitting a negative review. For example, Lady Bird had a 100% rating based on 196 positive reviews when a film critic (Cole Smithey) submitted a negative review solely in response to the perfect rating. To date, Lady Bird has a 99% rating with 395 positive reviews and four negative reviews. Paddington 2 held a perfect rating from its release in 2017 until film critic Eddie Harrison published a negative review in June 2021. The film has a 99% rating with 252 reviews, with two negative reviews, one of which is from the aforementioned critic. The 100% rating could also be affected by rediscovering negative reviews, as in the case with Citizen Kane when an 80-year-old negative review from the Chicago Tribune affected its former 100% rating with 115 reviews.

List

See also 
 List of films considered the best
 List of films considered the worst
 List of films with a 0% rating on Rotten Tomatoes
 AFI's 100 Years...100 Movies (10th Anniversary Edition)

References 

Rotten Tomatoes
Rotten Tomatoes